Dmitriy Andreyevich Gorbushin (born 31 May 1986) is a Ukrainian-Russian former professional footballer. He also holds Russian citizenship.

Career
He made his debut in the Russian Premier League for FC Kuban Krasnodar in a game against FC Tom Tomsk on 11 April 2009. On 5 August 2009 FC Chernomorets Novorossiysk have signed the midfielder Dmitry Gorbushin on loan from Kuban Krasnodar until December 2009.

On 9 July 2018, Gorbushin signed for FK Khujand, leaving Khujand at the end of his contract in January 2019.

References

External links
 
 
 

1986 births
Living people
Association football midfielders
People from Rubizhne
Russian footballers
Ukrainian footballers
Ukrainian expatriate footballers
Expatriate footballers in Russia
Expatriate footballers in Belarus
Expatriate footballers in Thailand
Russian Premier League players
FC Stal Alchevsk players
FC Dynamo Kyiv players
FC Dynamo-2 Kyiv players
FC Zorya Luhansk players
FC Kuban Krasnodar players
FC Chernomorets Novorossiysk players
FC Minsk players
Dmitry Gorbushin
Expatriate footballers in Tajikistan
Dmitry Gorbushin
Sportspeople from Luhansk Oblast